Schneider Kreuznach is the abbreviated name of the company Jos. Schneider Optische Werke GmbH, which is sometimes also simply referred to as Schneider.  They are a manufacturer of industrial and photographic optics. The company was founded on 18 January 1913 by Joseph Schneider as Optische Anstalt Jos. Schneider &  Co. at Bad Kreuznach in Germany. The company changed its name to Jos. Schneider & Co., Optische Werke, Kreuznach in 1922, and to the current Jos. Schneider Optische Werke GmbH in 1998.

In 2001, Schneider received an Oscar for Technical Achievement for their Super-Cinelux motion picture lenses. It is best known as manufacturers of large format lenses for view cameras, enlarger lenses, and photographic loupes. It also makes a limited amount of small- and medium-format lenses, and has at various times manufactured eyeglasses and camera rangefinders, as well as being an OEM lens maker for Kodak and Samsung digital cameras. It has supplied the lenses for various LG devices and the BlackBerry Priv. It also supplied the lenses for the Kodak Regent camera in the 1930s and other classic cameras such as certain models of the Rolleiflex starting in the 1940s, the Kodak Retina and Kodak Retinette camera series in the 1950s and 1960s, and certain specialty lenses for Hasselblad. In 1961, it created Feinwerktechnik GmbH, a manufacturer of electrical-hydraulic servo valves.

In recent years, it has acquired several other companies:
In 1985, it acquired the B+W Filter Manufacturing Company (founded in 1947 by partners Biermann and Weber), maker of the line of B+W filters. 
In July 1987, it purchased Rollei Fototechnic GmbH.
In 1989, it purchased Käsemann/Oberaudorf, a manufacturer of glass and plastic polarizing materials.
After 1991 it acquired the former East-German (GDR) camera and lens manufacturer Pentacon/Practica (Dresden)
In 2000, it acquired Century Optics, an American lensmaking firm.

From the start of its production in 1914, Schneider had produced their 500,000th lens by June 1932, its millionth by November 1936, and its 10 millionth lens by January 1967. As of April 2000, it had produced over 14,730,000 lenses. The list below converts any cm designations on earlier lenses to mm (so a 16.5 cm lens is shown as a 165 mm lens).

Small format lenses

Angulon
Schneider Kreuznach lens made for the German 35mm SL35 and SL350 SLR Rollei cameras (Quick Bayonet Mount) QBM

Rollei SL-Angulon 35 mm f2.8

C-Curtagon

A very small lens, available in M42 screw mount.
28 mm f/4
35 mm f/2.8
35 mm f/4

Curtagon
28 mm f/4 (also made in DKL-mount for Kodak Retina Reflex S and later cameras)
35 mm f/2.8
Electric 35 mm f/2.8
Edixa 35 mm f2.8 (M42 mount, similar in appearance and design to the standard Curtagon 35mm f2.8 for Exakta with knurled Zebra focus ring)
Edixa 35 mm f2.8 (Edixa bayonet mount, Zebra non-knurled focus ring with 'Schneider Kreuznach - Edixa Curtagon' lettering on front of the lens but placed outside the filter ring) 
Edixa 35 mm f2.8 (Edixa bayonet mount, a completely different external design in all silver compared to the previous 2 Edixa-Curtagon designs)
Retina 35 mm f/2.8 (a complete lens with focusing ring and aperture control with the DKL Deckel mount)
Alpa 35 mm f2.8
35 mm f2.8, for Rollei SL 35 and SL 350 QBM mount (rare)
35 mm f/4.0

PA-Curtagon

A perspective-control lens of 7 elements in 6 groups for 35mm cameras, which allows shifting of up to 7 mm, in an axis defined by a separate rotating ring on the lens.  The PA-Curtagon is available in Praktica (M42), Exakta, Alpa-Reflex, Leica R, Minolta, Miranda, Canon, Nikon, Contarex, and Olympus OM mounts. It was also available for Rollei QBM mount under the name PC-Curtagon.
35 mm f/4

Curtar-Xenon

Retina-Curtar-Xenon C 35 mm f/4 (made for the German Kodak Retina IIc/IIC, IIIc/IIIC, and Kodak Retina Reflex cameras, the lens only incorporates the front optical block and has no aperture ring, these are part of the camera)
Retina-Curtar-Xenon C 35 mm f5.6 (made for the German Kodak Retina convertible lens cameras, the lens only incorporates the front optical block and has no aperture ring, these are part of the camera)

Radiogon
35 mm f/4.0

Radionar

A 3-element, 3-group design with a minimum aperture of f/22.
40 mm f/2.8
35mm f 4.0 with a minimum aperture of f/22. Lens is the same as Curtagon version, only serial numbers are earlier.

Reomar

A 3-element, 3-group design with a minimum aperture of f/22.
45 mm f/2.8

Super-Angulon
21 mm f/4.0
A 9/4 wide-angle lens with a minimum aperture of f/22
21 mm f/3.4
An update of the f/4.0 model, with an 8/4 design and slightly increased sharpness.

Super-Angulon R

A 10/8 wide-angle lens with a minimum aperture of f/22.
21 mm f/4

PC-Super-Angulon

A 28 mm f/2.8 shift lens with 67EW filter thread and a lens shade with filter holder for 74R rimless filters and M92x1.00 filter ring. Many user-changeable mechanically-only mount modules available from Schneider Kreuznach. Also available as Leica PC-Super-Angulon R 28 mm f/2.8 with Leica R mount. Can be modified from a shift-only lens to a tilt-only lens by the German company.
 SUPER-ANGULON 28 f/2.8 for Canon EF and Nikon F mount (2014)
 SUPER-ANGULON 50 f/2.8 for Canon EF and Nikon F mount (2014)

Tele-Arton
85 mm f/4
90 mm f/4

Tele-Variogon
80–240 mm f/4

Tele-Xenar
5 cm f/5.5 (early 1930s)
75 mm f/3.8
90 mm f/3.5
100 mm f/3.8
135 mm f/3.5
135 mm f/4
150 mm f/4
150 mm f/4.5
200 mm f/5.5
240 mm f/4.5
240 mm f/5.5
360 mm f/5.5

Variogon

The first variable-focal-length lens with fixed back focal distance for 35 mm cameras, introduced in 1964.
45–100 mm f/2.8
80–240 mm f/4

These lenses were available with 19 interchangeable mounts (loosen two screws and replace with a different mount).  The mounts each have a small number on them and equate as follows:
 Type of mount
2  = M42 (Pentax Screw, Universal Screw, etc.)
3  = Exacta Bayonet
4  = Alpa Bayonet
10 = Canon FD
11 = C Mount
13 = Nikon F
14 = Leica R
15 = Contare
?  = Arriflex
? = Arri MT?

Production of the 80–240 mm f/4 is said to be approximately 250 units, the 45–100 mm f/2.8 about 57 units.  The 80–240 is split amongst two different variants.

Xenagon
4 elements in 3 groups of genre "Wide Angle Tessar"
30 mm f/3.5
 35 mm f/2.8
 35 mm f/3.5 (Voss Diax mount)
 35 mm f/4.0

Xenar
The Xenar uses a Tessar type optical formula, originally designed by Paul Rudolph for Zeiss (4 elements in 3 groups, with the rear element consisting of a cemented doublet). The formula could only be used by Schneider Kreuznach after the original 1902 Tessar patent had expired in 1919. Many other famous lenses with large production runs were based on this formula (e.g. Leitz Elmar, Voigtländer Skopar, Kodak Ektar).
38mm f/2.8 (for 24x24mm)
40mm f/3.5 (for Rollei 35)
45mm f/2.8
50mm f/2.8 (for 24x36mm)
50mm f/3.5
60mm f/3.5
75mm f/2.8
75mm f/3.5 (for 6x6 medium format, e.g. Rolleicord from model III to Vb)
75mm f/4.5 <Kodak (Nagel Factory) Vollenda 127 Film Camera, Compur Shutter 2668918, 1933, Germany>
105mm f/4.5 for 2&1/2 x 3&1/4 sheet film cameras
13.5 cm f/4.5 (1936)

Xenogon
A wide-angle of type Xenon. 7 elements in 5 groups.
35 mm f/2.8 (a small lens for Leica L39 mount similar to the Leica 35mm f3.5 Summaron)
35 mm f/2.8 (a completely different external lens design for the German Robot Royal 26 bayonet mount camera)

Xenon

Designed in 1925 by Tronnier, it is an asymmetrical derivative of the classical double-Gauss design.
16 mm f/1.9
35 mm f/1.6 – made for Canon EF and Nikon F Mount 2015
40 mm f/1.9
50 mm f/1.5 – made for Leica M39/Screw Mount ca.1942–1947
50 mm f/1.4 – made for Canon EF and Nikon F Mount 2015
50 mm f/1.9
50 mm f/1.8
50 mm f/2.3
50 mm f/2.0 1954–1957
17 mm f/0.95
25 mm f/0.95

Medium format lenses

Variogon

The Variogon is a zoom lens.
60-140mm f/4.6 AF (for Rollei 6000)
60–140 mm f/4.6 AFD (for Rollei Hy6)
70–140 mm f/4.5 (for Bronica ETR)
75–150 mm f/4.5 (for Rollei 6000, Bronica SQ & Exakta 66 [1980s–2000 version])
125–250 mm f/5.6 (for Bronica ETR)
140–280 mm f/5.6 (for Hasselblad 500 C/M, Hasselblad 2000 FC, Rollei 6000 & Exakta 66 [1980s–2000 version])

Super-Angulon
40 mm f/3.5 (for Rollei 6000)
50 mm f/2.8 (for Rollei 6000)
50 mm f/2.8 AF (for Rollei 6000)
50 mm f/2.8 AFD (for Rollei Hy6)

PCS Super-Angulon

PCS stands for "Perspective Control, Scheimpflug", which indicates that this is a tilt and shift version of the Super-Angulon.  This lens will shift up to 12 mm up/10 mm down, and tilt up to 10°, all in the vertical axis.
55 mm f/4.5 (for Bronica ETR, Rollei 6000 & Exakta 66 [1980s–2000 version])

Curtagon
60 mm f/3.5 (for Rollei 6000 & Exakta 66 [1980s–2000 version])

Xenotar
75 mm f/3.5 (for Rolleiflex E & E3 TLR)
80 mm f/2.8 (for Rollei 6000 & Exakta 66 [1980s–2000 version])
80 mm f/2 (for Rollei 6000)
80 mm f/2.8 AF (for Rollei 6000)
80 mm f/2.8 AFD (for Rollei Hy6)

Apo-Symmar Makro
90 mm f/4 (for Rollei 6000)
150 mm f/4.6 (for Rollei 6000)

Tele-Xenar
150 mm f/4 (for Rollei 6000 & Exakta 66 [1980s–2000 version])
150 mm f/4 AF (for Rollei 6000)
150 mm f/4 AFD (for Rollei Hy6)
180 mm f/2.8 (for Rollei 6000)
180 mm f/2.8 AF (for Rollei 6000)
180 mm f/2.8 AFD (for Rollei Hy6)
250 mm f/5.6 (for Exakta 66 [1980s–2000 version])

Apo-Tele-Xenar
300 mm f/4 (for Rollei 6000)

Leaf Shutter

The Leaf Shutter lenses are designed for the Phase One (company) 645 camera platform.
LS 28 mm f/4,5 Aspherical
LS 55 mm f/2.8
LS 80 mm f/2.8
LS 40-80mm LS f/4.0-5.6
LS 110 mm f/2.8
LS 75–150 mm f/4,0-5,6
LS 150 mm f/3.5
LS 240 mm f/4,5 IF

APO-DIGITAR

PC-TS APO-DIGITAR for Mamiya / Phase One. Same lens is available as LEICA TS-APO-ELMAR-S 1:5,6/120 mm ASPH for Leica S. It is a tilt–shift lens.
LS 120 mm f/5.6

Large format lenses

Schneider's line of large format lenses has a reputation for high-quality construction and durability, and all lenses carry a lifetime warranty.  Some of the higher-end lenses of the Schneider line are among the most expensive optics available in large format photography.

Angulon

Introduced in 1930, the Angulon is the original Schneider wide-angle lens line. It is a 6-element, 2-group, symmetric anastigmat design somewhat related to the Goerz Dagor. Compared to many modern wide angles, they are quite compact, though the angle of coverage is only 80°, although an early catalogue from 1934 lists this series as having an angle of view of 105° (it is unclear as to the test-conditions or what is deemed an acceptable result). They are color-corrected reasonably well, but suffer from significant softening of the image close to the edge of the circle of illumination. Only the outer elements are supported by the mount, the inner elements are mounted by cementing to the outer elements. For this reason they are prone to "slippage", especially if stored "on end" in hot climates.

Coverage of 90-210mm at f/11
65mm f/6.8 (for 6×9 cm)
90mm f/6.8 (for 4x5")
120mm f/6.8 (for 5x7")
165mm f/6.8 (for 8x10")
210mm f/6.8 (for 10x12")

A catalogue from 1934 also proclaims the Angulon f/6.8 series as a convertible anastigmat: "...the components of which can be used separately and give two different foci". When the elements are used separately, their focal lengths are approximately x1.5 for the Rear and x2 for the Front, the narrower aperture results in the need for 2x and 4x longer exposures, respectively.
90mm Rear 140mm, Front 185mm (for 4x5")
120mm Rear 185mm, Front 250mm (for 5x7")
165mm Rear 260mm, Front 345mm (for 8x10")
210mm Rear 330mm, Front 430mm (for 10x12")

Super-Angulon

These are wide-angle lenses which have been developed in several steps.  The Super-Angulons are Biogon designs, making for huge, heavy lenses, but also giving very generous angles of coverage.  The f/4 lenses give 95° of coverage, the f/8 models give 100°, and the f/5.6 units give a 105° coverage angle.  The f/4 and f/5.6 lenses are 8-element, 4-group designs, while the f/8 lenses are older 6-element, 4-group, symmetrical designs.  Coating technologies improved along the production life of these lenses, and recent Super-Angulons are multicoated.
47mm f/5.6 (for 6×9 cm)
47mm f/8
53mm f/4 (for 6×7 cm)
65mm f/5.6 (for 4×5 in)
65mm f/8
75mm f/5.6
75mm f/8
90mm f/5.6
90mm f/8
120mm f/8 (for 5×7 in)
121mm f/8
165mm f/8 (for 8×10 in)
210mm f/8 (for 11×14 in)

Super-Angulon XL

This is an update of the Super-Angulon lens design, incorporating modern glass and multicoating technologies, and an expanded angle of coverage.
38mm f/5.6 (120°, for 6×9 cm)
47mm f/5.6 (120°, for 4×5 in)
58mm f/5.6 (110°)
72mm f/5.6 (115°, for 5×7 in)
90mm f/5.6 (110°)

Symmar

The Symmar is one of the original Schneider designs, introduced in 1920, and is still relevant and used today. They have a 6-element, 4-group, symmetric design, and give a 70° angle of coverage. The f/5.6 series of lenses are "convertible", meaning that by removing one of the lens cells the user creates a 3 element lens of longer focal length than the complete lens. The resulting 3 element lens has a narrower aperture of f/12 and an angle of view of 40°. These lenses have two aperture markings, one in white for the complete lens and one in green for the converted lens. When "converted" the resulting 3 element lens will produce softer images than the complete lens.

Coverage of the f/6.8-series at "small stop"
60mm f/6.8 (for 6x12cm)
75mm f/6.8 (for 6x12cm)
80mm f/5.6 (for 6×7 cm)
90mm f/6.8 (for 4x5")
100mm f/5.6 & 175mm f/12 (for 6×9 cm)
105mm f/6.8 (for 4×5")
120mm f/6.8 (for 5x7")
135mm f/5.6 & 235mm f/12 (for 4×5")
135mm f/6.8 (for 5x7")
150mm f/5.6 & 265mm f/12 (for 4×5")
150mm f/6.8 (for 5x7")
165mm f/6.8 (for 5x7")
180mm f/5.6 & 315mm f/12 (for 5×7")
180mm f/6.8 (for 8x10")
195mm f/6.8 (for 8x10")
210mm f/5.6 & 370mm f/12 (for 5×7")
210mm f/6.8 (for 10x12")
240mm f/5.6 & 420mm f/12 (for 8×10")
240mm f/6.8 (for 11x14")
270mm f/6.8 (for 14x16")
300mm f/5.6 & 500mm f/12 (for 8×10")
300mm f/6.8 (for 16x18")
360mm f/5.6 & 620mm f/12 (for 11×14")
360mm f/6.8 (for 16x20")

Symmar-S

The Symmar-S is an incremental improvement to the original Symmar design, adding multicoating to the feature set.  The lens is not symmetric like its predecessor and is not convertible. The available focal lengths are slightly different, with the subtraction of the 80 mm, and addition of a 120 mm and two 480 mm lenses of varying speeds.
100 mm f/5.6 (for 6×9 cm)
120 mm f/5.6 (for 4×5 in)
135 mm f/5.6
150 mm f/5.6
180 mm f/5.6 (for 5×7 in)
210 mm f/5.6
240 mm f/5.6 (for 8×10 in)
300 mm f/5.6
360 mm f/6.8 (for 11×14 in)
480 mm f/8.4
480 mm f/9.4

Apo-Symmar

This is a 6-element, 4-group apochromatic lens design, which has since been replaced by the Apo-Symmar L-Series.  Using low-dispersion glass and multicoating techniques, secondary-spectrum reflections have been greatly reduced.  The Apo-Symmar lenses up to 360 mm have a 72° angle of coverage, and the 480 mm lenses give a 56° angle.
100 mm f/5.6 (for 6×9 cm)
120 mm f/5.6 (for 4×5 in)
135 mm f/5.6
150 mm f/5.6
180 mm f/5.6 (for 5×7 in)
210 mm f/5.6
240 mm f/5.6 (for 8×10 in)
300 mm f/5.6
360 mm f/6.8 (for 11×14 in)
480 mm f/8.4
480 mm f/9.4

Apo-Symmar L-Series

This is a redesign of the Apo-Symmar line, using new environmentally friendly glass compositions and incorporating slightly more coverage.  These are 6-element, 4-group apochromatic lenses with a 75° angle of coverage.
120 mm f/5.6 (for 4×5 in)
150 mm f/5.6 (for 5×7 in)
180 mm f/5.6
210 mm f/5.6 (for 8×10 in)
300 mm f/5.6
480 mm f/8.4 (for 11×14 in)

Super-Symmar HM

These are 8-element, 6-group variations of the Symmar line, which feature an 80° angle of coverage.  The HM in the name indicates that these lenses use high-modulation glass elements.
120 mm f/5.6 (for 4×5 in)
150 mm f/5.6 (for 5×7 in and 4x10 in)
210 mm f/5.6 (for 8×10 in)

Super-Symmar XL

These are wide-angle lenses of a 6-element, 5-group aspheric design, which give a 105° angle of coverage.  These lenses are also heavily corrected for chromatic aberrations, and are physically more compact than other wide-angle lenses of similar focal lengths.
80 mm f/4.5 (for 5×7 in)
110 mm f/5.6 (for 5x7 in)
150 mm f/5.6 (for 8×10 in)
210 mm f/5.6 (for 11×14 in)

Xenar

Schneider's inexpensive, classic Xenar asymmetrical, anastigmatic, 4-element, 3-group lens design was introduced in 1919, and is largely unchanged from the original Zeiss Tessar formula.  They feature an angle of coverage of 60–62°.
75mm f/3.5 (for 6×6 cm)
90mm f/4.5 (for 6×9 cm)
90mm f/5.5
100mm f/3.5
105mm f/2.9
105mm f/3.5
105mm f/3.8
105mm f/4.5
105mm f/5.5
120mm f/3.5
120mm f/4.5
120mm f/5.5
135mm f/3.5 (for 4×5")
135mm f/3.8
135mm f/4.5
135mm f/4.7
135mm f/5.5
150mm f/3.5
150mm f/4.5
150mm f/5.5
165mm f/3.5
165mm f/4.5
165mm f/5.5
180mm f/3.5
180mm f/4.5
180mm f/5.5
195mm f/4.5 (for 5×7")
195mm f/5.5
210mm f/3.5
210mm f/4.5
210mm f/5.5
210mm f/6.1
240mm f/3.5
240mm f/4.5
270mm f/4.5
300mm f/3.5 (for 8×10")
300mm f/4.5
300mm f/5.6
360mm f/4.5
420mm f/4.5 (for 11×14")
480mm f/4.5 (for 14×17")

Aero-Xenar
250mm f/4.5 (for 4.5x6")
300mm f/4.5 (for 5x7")
500mm f/4.5 (for 5x12")

Tele-Xenar

An inexpensive 4-element, 2-group telephoto lens design featuring 35° of coverage.  The 1000 mm lenses, by comparison, give only an 18° angle of coverage, but require even less focal distance than other telephoto designs (slightly more than 1/2 the effective focal length, as opposed to about 2/3 for a normal tele lens).
180mm f/5.5
180mm f/5.6
240mm f/5.5
270mm f/5.5
300mm f/5.5
360mm f/5.5 (for 4x5")
500mm f/5.5
1000mm f/8
1000mm f/10

Apo-Tele-Xenar

These are apochromatic telephoto lenses using a 5-element variation of the Tele-Xenar design.  They can be used on subjects as close as 2 meters without a loss of resolution, and are painted a non-reflective flat grey to reduce thermal absorption and expansion under sunlight or hot studio lights. The 400 mm Compact model is half the length and 70% the weight of the normal Apo-Tele-Xenar 400 mm lens. The 350 mm compact model is actually not a tele-design but a dialyte; however it is called the Apo Tele Xenar 350 Compact.
350mm f/11 Compact (for up to 8x10 in)
400 mm f/5.6 (for 5×7 in)
400 mm f/5.6 Compact
800 mm f/12 (for 8×10 in)

Xenotar

A 5-element, 4-group design, giving a 60° angle of coverage.  These are fast lenses compared to other lens designs of similar focal length, but with somewhat less coverage.
75mm f/3.5 (for 6×6 cm)
80mm f/2.8 (for 6×7 cm)
100mm f/4
100mm f/2.8 (for 6×9 cm)
105mm f/2.8
135mm f/3.5 (for 4x5")
150mm f/2.8
210mm f/2.8 (for 5×7")

Tele-Arton

The Tele-Arton is a telephoto design.  Earlier f/4 and f/5.5 models are 5 elements in 4 groups.  The 250 mm f/5.6 is a modern multicoated 5-element, 5-group lens.  All models have a 35° angle of coverage.
180 mm f/4 (for 6×9 cm)
180 mm f/5.5
240 mm f/5.5
250 mm f/5.6 (for 4×5 in)
270 mm f/5.5
360 mm f/5.5 (for 5×7 in)

Fine-Art XXL
The Fine-Art XXL line is designed for ultra-large format shooting, covering 20×24 inches.  Both lenses are large and heavy, but are designed with exceptional image quality and a huge 900 mm circle of coverage in mind.  The 550 mm lens is a 6/2 construction, giving 78° of coverage, while the 1100 mm lens is 4/4 with 45.7° of coverage.  Both lenses are mounted in a Copal 3 shutter, and the longer lens is also available in a barrel mount with Waterhouse stops, if the faster f/14 version is desired.
550mm f/11
770mm f/14.5
1100mm f/22(14)

Isconar

One of Schneider's original lens designs, a symmetric double gauss design, introduced in 1914.

Also known as the "Jsconar", the lens branding refers to "Joseph Schneider & Company -nar"

Radiogon

A 4-element, 4-group design.

Digital lenses

Digitar

The Digitar lenses are designed for use with digital imaging view camera systems, offering focal lengths ideal for the imaging area of digital backs, which are typically smaller than standard sheet film sizes. Digitar lenses also allow excellent results with film as well as digital imagers.
47 mm f/5.6
60 mm f/4.0
80 mm f/4.0
90 mm f/4.5
100 mm f/5.6
120 mm f/5.6
150 mm f/5.6

WA-Digitar

The WA-Digitar is a wide angle lens designed for use with digital imaging systems.
 28 mm f/2.8

M-Digitar

The M-Digitars are macro lenses offering 1:1 magnification, designed for use with digital imaging systems. They may also be used with good result with film cameras.
80 mm f/5.6
120 mm f/5.6

Copy and macro lenses

Claron

One of the original lens designs.

C-Claron

The C-Claron, or Copy-Claron, is a family of lenses designed for 1:1 reproduction.  The f/4.5 lenses are 4 elements in 3 or 4 groups, the f/5.6 are a 6/4 design, and the f/8 is 8/4.  All were supplied from the factory in barrel mount.
100mm f/8
135mm f/4.5
200mm f/4.5
200mm f/5.6
210mm f/4.5
210mm f/5.6
240mm f/5.6

D-Claron

The D-Claron (Dokumentations-Claron) is a lens family designed for copying of documents onto microfilm.
10mm f/1.8 (for 16mm)
16mm f/2
25mm f/1.4
28mm f/2
35mm f/2
40mm f/2
45mm f/3.5
60mm f/5.6 (for 35mm)
100mm f/4.0
105mm f/5.6 (for 70mm)
180mm f/5.6
210mm f/5.6 (for 105mm)

G-Claron

The Grafik-Clarons are 6-element, 4-group, symmetrical plasmat-type lenses with a 64° angle of coverage, designed for 1:1 flat-field reproduction, but can be used as macro lenses at magnifications up to 5:1 as well. It is recommended to stop down to at least than f/22 for use at infinity.  They are available in barrel mount, as well as mounted in shutters.

Coverage listed at 1:1
150mm f/9 (for 8x10")
210mm f/9 (for 11x14")
240mm f/9 (for 14x17")
270mm f/9 (for 16x20")
305mm f/9
355mm f/9 (for 20x24")

G-Claron WA

A wide-angle process lens with 4 elements in 4 groups, optimized for reproduction ratios between 2:1 and 1:2.  The 270 mm lens has an angle of coverage of 72°, the 240 mm has 80°, and the 210 mm has 86°, which give these lenses gigantic image circles, though the image softens considerably near the edges of coverage.
210mm f/11 (for 20×24 in)
240mm f/11 (for 16×20 in)
270mm f/11 (for 20×24 in)

Repro-Claron

The Repro-Claron is a line of 4-element, 4-group lenses optimized for 1:1 reproduction ratios, but still usable at infinity.  The f/9 lenses also have a slot for between-the-lens filtration or Waterhouse stops, the latter of which are available in f/128, f/180, and f/260.
55mm f/8
135mm f/8
210mm f/9
305mm f/9
355mm f/9
420mm f/9
485mm f/9
610mm f/9

Apo-Artar

Apo-Artar lenses are an apochromatic symmetrical 4-element design, which is optimized for 1:1 reproduction.  These lenses give 46° of coverage up to 480mm, 40° in 890-1065mm, and 38° in 1205mm.

Coverage listed at 1:1.
240mm f/9 (for 4×5")
360mm f/9 (for 11×14")
480mm f/11 (for 11x14")
610mm f/11 (for 20x24")
890mm f/14 (for 30x40")
1065mm f/14 (for 33x46")
1205mm f/14 (for 40x50")

Apo-Artar HM

Apo-Artar HM lenses are an apochromatic symmetrical 6-element design, which is optimized for 1:1 reproduction.  The HM in the name indicates that these lenses use high-modulation glass elements.
 75mm f/4 (up to 6x7 cm)

Macro-Symmar HM

The Macro-Symmar HM is a variation of the Symmar design, engineered for 1:1 macro work and flat-field copying.  The 80 mm is a 6-element, 4-group lens with a 47° angle of coverage, while the other lenses in the line are 8-element, 4-group designs with 55° of coverage.  The HM in the name indicates that these lenses use high-modulation glass elements.
85 f/2.4 HM (for 24×36 mm) for Canon EF and Nikon F mount (2014)
80mm f/5.6 (for 6×9 cm)
90 f/4.5 HM for Canon EF and Nikon F mount (2014)
120mm f/5.6 (for 5×7 in)
180mm f/5.6 (for 8×10 in)

M-Componon

The M-Componon is a special-purpose macro (makro) lens, designed for greater than 1:1 reproduction.
28mm f/4 (4:1 ~ 20:1)
50mm f/4 (2:1 ~ 12:1)
80mm f/4 (1:1 ~ 7:1)

Variomorphot

A process lens with 12 elements in 8 groups and a fixed aperture, optimized for a 1:1 reproduction ratio.  It has the capability of altering the aspect ratio of the image by up to 8% without any image degradation.
480mm f/22 (for 18×20 in)

Enlarger lenses

These lenses are designed for work with a photographic enlarger. They have barrel mounts and many current models feature glow-in-the-dark aperture scales.

Componar

This is the original Schneider line of enlarging lenses, introduced in 1914.  Optical designs are 3 elements in 3 groups.
26 mm f/4.5
50mm f/3,5( for 35mm)
50 mm f/4 (for 35 mm)
50 mm f/4.5
60 mm f/4 (for 4×4 cm)
75 mm f/4.5 (for 6×6 cm)
80 mm f/4.5 (for 6×7 cm)
105 mm f/4.5 (for 6×9 cm)
135 mm f/4.5 (for 4×5 in)

Componar-C

A 3-element, 3-group line of enlarging lenses, optimized for enlargements up to 8×.
50mm f/2.8 (for 24x36mm)
75mm f/4 (for 6×6 cm)

Componar-S

This was the original high-end enlarging lens line, the Componar-Satz.  This is the currently available low-end enlarging lens line.  They are 4-element, 3-group designs, and optimized for enlargements in the 6×-10× range.
50 mm f/2.8
80 mm f/4.5
90 mm f/4.5
105 mm f/4.5

Comparon

A middle-grade (but still very good quality) line of enlarging optics. They are 4-element, 3-group, Tessar-based designs, and optimized for enlargements in the 2×-6× range.
50mm f/3.5 (for 24x36mm)
50mm f/4
75mm f/4.5 (for 6×6 cm)
105mm f/4.5 (for 6×9 cm)
135mm f/4.5 (for 4×5")
150mm f/5.6
210mm f/5.6 (for 5×7")
300mm f/5.6 (for 8×10")

Componon

The Componon is a high-quality enlarging lens line.  These models have been largely superseded by the Componon-S units, though a few Componon lenses are still manufactured today.  Optical designs are 6 elements in 4 groups, and they are optimized for >10× enlargements.
16 mm f/2.8
25 mm f/4
28 mm f/4 (for 18×24 mm)
35 mm f/4 (for 126 film)
40 mm f/4 (for 24x24 mm)
50 mm f/4 (for 24x36 mm)
60 mm f/5.6 (for 4×4 cm)
80 mm f/5.6 (for 6×6 cm)
100 mm f/5.6 (for 6×7 cm)
105 mm f/5.6 (for 6×9 cm)
135 mm f/5.6 (for 4×5 in)
150 mm f/5.6 (for 4×5 in)
180 mm f/5.6 (for 5×7 in)
210 mm f/5.6 (for 5×7 in)
240 mm f/5.6 (for 8×10 in)
300 mm f/5.6 (for 24×30 cm)
360 mm f/5.6 (for 30×40 cm)

Componon-S

These are high quality enlarger lenses which are updated versions of the Componon line. Most are 6-element, 4-group lenses except for the 50mm F2.8 which was originally released as a 5-element, 4-group design but which changed (from serial number ...?) to a 6-element, 4-group design. They are corrected for flatness of field, contrast, and color rendition.
50 mm f/2.8 (for 35 mm)
80 mm f/4 (for 6×6 cm)
80 mm f/5.6
100 mm f/5.6 (for 6×9 cm)
105 mm f/5.6
135 mm f/5.6 (for 4×5 in)
150 mm f/5.6 (for 4×5 in)
180 mm f/5.6 (for 5×7 in)
210 mm f/5.6 (for 5×7 in)
240 mm f/5.6 (for 8×10 in)
300 mm f/5.6 (for 24×30 cm)
360 mm f/6.8 (for 10x12 in)

WA-Componon

A 6-element, 4-group line of wide-angle enlarging lenses.
40mm f/4 (for 24x36mm)
60mm f/5.6 (for 6×6 cm)
80mm f/5.6 (for 6×9 cm)

G-Componon
A 6-element, 4-group line of lenses optimized for enlargements above 20×.
100 mm f/5.6 (for 6×9 cm)
150 mm f/5.6 (for 4×5 in)
210 mm f/5.6 (for 5×7 in)
240 mm f/5.6
300 mm f/5.6 (for 8×10 in)
360 mm f/6.8
480 mm f/9.4 (for 24×30 cm)

APO-Componon HM

These are 6-element, 4-group apochromatic enlarger lenses, using high-modulation glass elements, designed for critical color rendition and precision industrial applications.
40 mm f/2.8
45 mm f/4
60 mm f/4
90 mm f/4.5
120 mm f/5.6
150 mm f/4

Betavaron

The Betavaron is a zoom enlarging lens for 35 mm film.  The relative positions of the negative, paper easel, and lens remain fixed, while the magnification setting of the lens is changed to alter the degree of enlargement.  The design is 11 elements.  The Betavaron 3...10, the base model, is limited to 3.1–10× magnification, with a maximum aperture of f/4.1-f/5.6 (the aperture changes slightly with the magnification).  Adding a supplementary −0.9 diopter lens turns the unit into a Betavaron 5,3...17, and changes the magnification range to 5.3–17×, and the maximum aperture to f/5.4-f/5.7.

Motion picture lenses

Schneider produced its first cinema projection lenses in 1915.

Cinegon
10mm f 1.8 (16mm format)
11.5mm f1.9
16mm f 1.4 C-mount

Super-Cinelux

A range of projection lenses for 35mm and 70mm motion picture film with an aperture of f/2.

24 mm f/2 (for 35 mm)
26 mm f/2
28 mm f/2
30 mm f/2
32.5 mm f/2
35 mm f/2
37.5 mm f/2
40 mm f/2

42.5 mm f/2
45 mm f/2
47.5 mm f/2
50 mm f/2
52.5 mm f/2
55 mm f/2
57.7 mm f/2
60 mm f/2 (for 35 mm or 70 mm)

65 mm f/2
70 mm f/2
75 mm f/2
80 mm f/2
85 mm f/2
90 mm f/2
95 mm f/2
100 mm f/2

ES Super-Cinelux 2X

Available as either anamorphic converters for prime lenses longer than 42.5 mm, or as standalong anamorphic projection lenses, in focal lengths from 42.5 mm to 100 mm.

Super-35-Cinelux

The Super-35-Cinelux is a line of projection lenses designed for 35 mm film.  Lenses of 55 mm focal length and shorter are 7 elements, and 60 and longer are 6, with no cemented surfaces to avoid any possible damage due to heat.

42.5 mm f/2
47.5 mm f/2
50 mm f/2
55 mm f/2
60 mm f/2
65 mm f/2
70 mm f/2

75 mm f/2
80 mm f/2
85 mm f/2
90 mm f/2
95 mm f/2
100 mm f/2

Cinelux-Ultra
 30–45 mm

Cinelux-Première

A projection lens incorporating aspheric elements to correct for spherical aberration.  They feature a variable aperture with an aperture range from f/1.7 to f/4.  These are available in normal or anamorphic models.

57.5 mm f/1.7
60 mm f/1.7
62.5 mm f/1.7
65 mm f/1.7
67.5 mm f/1.7
70 mm f/1.7

72.5 mm f/1.7
75 mm f/1.7
77.5 mm f/1.7
80 mm f/1.7
82.5 mm f/1.7
85 mm f/1.7

Cine-Xenon

A 6-element double gauss lens.

26 mm f/2.8
30 mm f/2
35 mm f/2
35 mm f/2.8
40 mm f/2
45 mm f/2
45 mm f/2.8
50 mm f/2
50 mm f/2.8
55 mm f/2
60 mm f/2
60 mm f/2.8

65 mm f/2
70 mm f/2
75 mm f/2
80 mm f/2
85 mm f/2
90 mm f/2
90 mm f/2.5
95 mm f/2
100 mm f/2
105 mm f/2
105 mm f/2.4

110 mm f/2
115 mm f/2
120 mm f/2
125 mm f/2
130 mm f/2
135 mm f/2
140 mm f/2
145 mm f/2
150 mm f/2
150 mm f/2.8

Note that some Xenon formula lenses sold for motion picture use are marked 'Xenon' rather than 'Cine-Xenon'.

Cine-Xenon also refers to projection lenses of the same design.

For 16mm
10 mm f/1.8
16 mm f/2.0
70 mm f/2.0

Vario-Cine-Xenon

A variable-focal-length projection lens for 35mm slides.
85–210 mm f/3.9

Optivaron
6–66 mm f/1.8 C-mount zoom lens (1.5 m to inf.) with macro control from 0 to 1.5 meters (0 to 59 inches)

PC Cine-Xenon

A 6-element projection lens for 35mm slides with perspective control, to eliminate problems with cross-fading multiple projectors.
45 mm f/2.8
60 mm f/2.8
90 mm f/2.8
105 mm f/2.9

Prolux

Long focal-length projection lenses for 35mm slides.
135 mm f/3
150 mm f/3
180 mm f/3.5
200 mm f/3.5
250 mm f/4.3

Vario-Prolux

Variable-focal-length projection lenses for 35mm slides.
70–120 mm f/3.5

Variogon

A variable-focal-length lens of 13 elements in 9 groups, originally introduced in 1959, after two years of development.
8–48 mm f/1.8 (for 8 mm)
10–40 mm f/2.8

Lenses for various mobile phones
LG Dare
LG Viewty KU990
LG Renoir KC910
LG Viewty Smart GC900
LG enV Touch
LG Arena KM900
LG Shine KE970
BlackBerry Priv

Gallery

References

External links

 Homepage of Schneider Kreuznach in English
 Vintage lens data from Schneider-Kreuznach
 Brochure archive from Schneider-Kreuznach (page is in German, but brochures are in German, English, and French)
 Some discussion of the Angulon from APUG

Schneider Kreuznach
Lens manufacturers
Optics manufacturing companies
Photography companies of Germany
Bad Kreuznach
German brands
Schneider Kreuznach PC-TS APO-DIGITAR
German companies established in 1913